Nagendra Rae Yadav or Nagendra Raya Yadav is a Nepalese politician belonging to CPN (Unified Socialist). He is also serving as member of Provincial Assembly of Madhesh Province.

He is currently serving as Minister of state for Industry, Tourism and Forest of Madhesh Province under minister Satrudhan Mahato.

Electoral history

2017 Nepalese provincial elections

See also 

 CPN (Unified Socialist)
 Ram Chandra Jha
 Bansidhar Mishra
 Satrudhan Mahato

References 

Communist Party of Nepal (Unified Socialist) politicians
Year of birth missing (living people)
Living people
Provincial cabinet ministers of Nepal
Members of the Provincial Assembly of Madhesh Province
Communist Party of Nepal (Unified Marxist–Leninist) politicians